Emmanuel Rasanayagam Tambimuttu (born c1890) was a Ceylon Tamil lawyer, politician and member of the Legislative Council of Ceylon and State Council of Ceylon.

Early life and family
Tambimuttu was born around 1890. His ancestors were originally from Nallur but later settled in Batticaloa in eastern eastern Ceylon.

Tambimuttu had a daughter - Laurel.

Career
Tambimuttu was an advocate. He contested the 1921 legislative council election as a candidate for the Eastern Province seat and was elected to the Legislative Council of Ceylon unopposed. Tambimuttu contested the 1924 legislative council election as a candidate for the Batticaloa seat and was re-elected to the Legislative Council.

Tambimuttu did not contest the 1931 state council election due to the boycott organised by the Jaffna Youth Congress. He contested the 1936 state council election as a candidate for the Trincomalee-Batticaloa seat and was elected to the State Council of Ceylon. In June 1943 he was found guilty by the Bribery Commission of accepting bribes but as he refused to resign he was expelled from the State Council.

Electoral history

References

1890s births
Ceylonese advocates
Members of the Legislative Council of Ceylon
Members of the 2nd State Council of Ceylon
People from Eastern Province, Sri Lanka
People from British Ceylon
Sri Lankan Tamil lawyers
Sri Lankan Tamil politicians
Year of birth uncertain
Year of death missing